Two Thousand and Ten Injuries is the third studio album from Swedish indie-pop group Love Is All, released on 23 March 2010 on the Polyvinyl Record Co. label.

Track listing

 "Bigger Bolder" – 2:54
 "Repetition" – 2:31
 "Never Now" – 3:26
 "Less Than Thrilled" – 2:16
 "Early Warnings" – 2:37
 "False Pretense" – 2:43
 "The Birds Were Singing With All Their Might" – 3:30
 "Again, Again" – 1:55
 "Kungen" – 2:46
 "A Side in a Bed" – 3:28
 "Dust" – 3:00
 "Take Your Time" – 3:05

Credits
Production
Love Is All and Wyatt Cusick

References

External links
 Two Thousand and Ten Injuries at Polyvinyl Record Co.

2010 albums
Love Is All albums
Polyvinyl Record Co. albums